Gangs of the Dead, originally Last Rites, is a zombie survival film released in 2006, starring Enrique Almeida and Reggie Bannister.

Plot
The film takes place in the city of Los Angeles, California, and follows two intertwined plots.

The main plot concerns a meteorite that crashes in Los Angeles. It carries alien spores that spread across the city, transforming humans into flesh-eating zombies.

The other story is about two rival gangs, "The Lords of Crenshaw" and "El Diablo", who continue to fight for dominance of Los Angeles even as it falls to the zombie horde.

Cast
 Enrique Almeida as Santos
 Howard Alonzo as Jerome
 Reggie Bannister as Mitchell
 Stephen Basilone as O'Bannon
 James C. Burns as Campbell

Release
The film was first released under its original title of Last Rites at the Los Angeles Film Festival on June 30, 2006. It was later released direct to video on May 1, 2007 under the new title of Gangs of the Dead.

In both Germany and Italy, the film was released under the title of City of the Dead.

In the United Kingdom, the film was released under the title of 48 Weeks Later, in an effort to capitalise on the success of 28 Weeks Later, which had been released in 2007.

References

External links
 

2006 films
American science fiction horror films
2006 independent films
2000s science fiction horror films
American zombie films
American independent films
Films set in Los Angeles
American post-apocalyptic films
Hood films
2000s English-language films
2000s American films